The 2013 FIBA Asia Under-18 3x3 Championship for Boys and Girls is the first edition of the FIBA Asia's 3x3 championship for boys and girls under the age of 18. The games were held at Bangkok, Thailand from 22 May to 24 May 2013. The Philippines and Taiwan clinched the inaugural FIBA Asia 3×3 Under-18 Championship for Boys and Girls, respectively.

Boys

Preliminary round

Group A

Group B

Group C

Group D

Knockout round

Girls

Preliminary round

Group A

Knockout round

External links
 Results (Archived)

2013
International basketball competitions hosted by Thailand
2012–13 in Asian basketball
2012–13 in Thai basketball
2013 in 3x3 basketball